Karl Kristian Anton 'Kalle' Schröder (30 October 1913 – 9 June 1982) was a Swedish tennis player.

Tennis career
Schröder made his debut for Sweden in the Davis Cup during 1935 against Ireland. He teamed-up with Curt Östberg to defeat the Irish, 3–2 in the second qualifying round, but the pair lost to the Netherlands in the final qualifying round. Between 1935 and 1939, Schröder played a total of 26 Davis Cup matches for Sweden and won 17 of these. His last Davis Cup tie was the 1939 Europe Zone Quarterfinals against Germany.  Schröder and doubles partner, Nils Rohlsson were victories against the German pair of Henner Henkel and Georg von Metaxa, but in the singles he and Morgan Hultman lost both of their respective singles matches, giving Germany a 4–1 victory.

Schröder was the first Swedish tennis player to truly achieve international success and during the years 1934 to 1942, he won 11 European Championship titles which include the German –, French – and English indoor championships.

Schröder twice participated at the Wimbledon Championships, in 1934 and 1937, and reached the second round on both occasions. In 1941 he became a professional player and after retirement he took up coaching and worked with Lennart Bergelin, among others.

See also
List of Sweden Davis Cup team representatives

References

External links

 
 

1913 births
1982 deaths
Swedish male tennis players
S
People from Lidingö Municipality
Sportspeople from Stockholm County